may refer to:

Places 

People 
 Given name
 Momoko Tsugunaga (nicknamed Momochi) (born 1992), former Japanese idol singer (Berryz Kobo)

 Surname
  (born 1977), Japanese sumo wrestler. (He took the name after the above-mentioned Momoko Tsugunaga.)
  (born 1986), Japanese singer-songwriter
  (1512-1581?), Japanese ninja
 Yusuke Momochi (born 1986), Japanese fighting games player